The City Theater (Teātr-e Šahr) is a performing arts complex in Tehran, the capital of Iran. This complex is considered as the main outlet of Iran artistic theater. It was built with the initiative of Shahbanu Farah Pahlavi under the rule of Mohammad Reza Pahlavi, the last Shah of Iran.

It contains several performance spaces including the halls of Cheharsou, Qashqai, Sayeh, the performance studio, and the main hall. The complex was designed by architect Ali Sardar Afkhami in the 1960s, and opened in 1972. After the 1979 Revolution, the Ministry of Culture and Islamic Guidance has overseen its operation. City Theater of Tehran is closed on Saturdays.

References

External links

 Official website
 YouTube. Video of Tehran International Puppet Theatre Festival event, 2010.

Buildings and structures in Tehran
Culture in Tehran
Theatre in Iran
Theatres completed in 1972
Tourist attractions in Tehran